Skauge is a Norwegian surname. Notable people with the surname include:

Anders Skauge (1912–2000), Norwegian politician
Arne Skauge (born 1948), Norwegian politician
Hallvard Skauge (born 1945), Norwegian illustrator

See also
Skaug

Surnames of Norwegian origin